CFEM-DT, virtual and VHF digital channel 13, branded on-air as TVA Abitibi-Témiscamingue, is a TVA-affiliated television station licensed to Rouyn-Noranda, Quebec, Canada and serving the Abitibi-Témiscamingue region. The station is owned by RNC Media, as part of a twinstick with Noovo affiliate CFVS-DT (channel 25), licensed to the neighbouring city of Val-d'Or. The two stations share studios on Avenue Murdoch and Avenue de la Saint Anne in Rouyn-Noranda; CFEM-DT's transmitter is located near Chemin Powell (north of Route 101). The station operates a rebroadcaster in Val-d'Or (CFEM-DT-1) on VHF channel 10. Both transmitters flash-cut to digital on September 1, 2011.

On cable, the station is available on Câblevision du Nord de Québec channel 10 and digital channel 120.

CFEM is the youngest of the TVA network affiliates, in terms of the year of sign-on, having launched in 1979.

References

External links
TVA Abitibi-Témiscamingue 
 

FEM
FEM
Television channels and stations established in 1979
FEM
1979 establishments in Quebec